Iowa Township is one of the thirteen townships of Sherman County, Kansas, United States.  The population was 44 at the 2000 census.

Geography
Located in the southeastern corner of the county, it borders the following townships:
Washington Township — north
Union Township — northeast
Kingery Township, Thomas County — east
McAllester Township, Logan County — southeast
Wallace Township, Wallace County — south
Smoky Township — west
Itasca Township — northwestern corner
It lies southeast of the county seat of Goodland.  There are no communities in the township.

The north fork of the Smoky Hill River flows through the southwestern part of Iowa Township, and the source of the south fork of the Solomon River is located in the northeastern part of the township.

Transportation
Only local roads are located in Iowa Township.

Government
Iowa Township is currently inactive; by Kansas law, when a township becomes inactive, its powers and duties revert to the county government.

References

External links
County website

Townships in Sherman County, Kansas
Townships in Kansas